Chintulla is a village in Ranga Reddy district in Andhra Pradesh, India. It falls under Yacharam mandal.

Schools
Zilla Parishad High School is located in the village.

References

Villages in Ranga Reddy district